Prince of the United Kingdom of Great Britain and Northern Ireland is a royal title normally granted to sons and grandsons of reigning and past British monarchs. The title is granted by the reigning monarch, who is the fount of all honours, through the issuing of letters patent as an expression of the royal will.

Individuals holding the title of prince will usually also be granted the style of His Royal Highness (HRH). 

When a British prince marries, his wife also becomes a British princess; however, she is addressed by the feminine version of the husband's senior title on his behalf, either a princely title or a peerage. Traditionally, all wives of male members of the British royal family, the aristocracy, and members of the public take the style and title of their husbands. An example of this case is Princess Michael of Kent, the wife of the King's first cousin once removed, Prince Michael of Kent.

There is also the case when a princess of blood royal marries a British prince. She also becomes a princess by marriage and will be addressed in the same way. An example of this situation was the late Princess Alexandra, Duchess of Fife: when she married the cousin of her mother, Prince Arthur of Connaught, she became Princess Arthur of Connaught, Duchess of Fife.

If a British prince has a peerage, then the princess is addressed by the feminine version of her husband's peer title; an example of this case is the wife of Prince William, who was (briefly) officially styled His Royal Highness The Duke of Cornwall and Cambridge while his wife Catherine became Her Royal Highness The Duchess of Cornwall and Cambridge, omitting both the 'prince' and 'princess' titles and their first names. When William was then created Prince of Wales, that became the senior title held in his own right, and he and Catherine are styled His/Her Royal Highness The Prince/Princess of Wales.

History
Before 1714, the title of prince and the style of HRH was not customary in usage. Sons and daughters of the sovereign were not automatically or traditionally called a prince or princess. An exception was the Prince of Wales, a title conferred on the eldest son of the sovereign since the reign of King Edward I of England. In the Kingdom of Scotland, even though an honorific principality was created by King James VI, the heir-apparent was only referred to as Duke of Rothesay. Some others include John, brother of King Richard I and later King John, who is sometimes called Prince John.

After the accession of King George I of Great Britain (the first monarch from the House of Hanover), it became customary for the sons of the sovereign and grandsons of the sovereign in the male line to be titled 'Prince' and styled His Royal Highness (abbreviated HRH). Great-grandsons of the sovereign were princes styled His Highness (abbreviated HH).

 The first male-line great-grandchild of a British monarch was not born until 1776. In keeping with tradition, he was given the style of His Highness Prince William of Gloucester (later Prince William Frederick, Duke of Gloucester and Edinburgh). On 22 July 1816 when he married his cousin and daughter of King George III, he was granted the style His Royal Highness. His only surviving elder sister, Princess Sophia of Gloucester, was also elevated to Her Royal Highness style the following day. Prince William died in 1834 before the accession of Queen Victoria.
 The first of the second set of male-line great-grandchildren of a British monarch was born on 21 September 1845 as Prince Ernest Augustus. He was granted the style of His Royal Highness because he was a male-line grandson of the King of Hanover and heir to the heir of that kingdom.

Just three weeks after the birth of her fourth grandchild but first male-line grandson, Victoria issued letters patent in 1864 which formally confirmed the practice of calling children and male-line grandchildren His Royal Highness with their titular dignity of Prince or Princess prefixed to their respective Christian names. The letters patent did not address the styling of great-grandchildren or further descendants as His/Her Highness or Prince or Princess.

Subsequent to 1864 some amendments regarding princes were made, with the issuance of specific letters patent changing the title and style of the following groups:

In 1898, the children of Prince George, Duke of York, the eldest living son of the Prince of Wales, were customarily titled princes, with the style of Highness, as great-grandchildren of Victoria in the male line. With letters patent dated 28 May 1898, the Crown granted the children of the eldest son of any Prince of Wales the style of Royal Highness.
In 1914, the children of Ernest Augustus, Duke of Brunswick, a great-great-grandchild of George III, were granted the title of prince and the style Highness by King George V, in letters patent dated 17 June 1914.
In 1917, George V issued a royal proclamation, altering the name of the Royal House from the House of Saxe-Coburg-Gotha to the House of Windsor and the discontinuance of the usage of the German titles of Duke of Saxony, Prince of Saxe-Coburg and Gotha and the like.
Later that year, letters patent altered the rights to the title prince and the style Royal Highness. These letters patent, dated 30 November 1917, stated that "the children of any Sovereign of these Realms and the children of the sons of any such Sovereign (as per the above Letters Patent of 1864) and the eldest living son of the eldest son of the Prince of Wales (a modification of the Letters Patent of 1898) shall have and at all times hold and enjoy the style, title or attribute of Royal Highness with their titular dignity of Prince or Princess prefixed to their respective Christian names or with their other titles of honour". It was also decreed in these letters that "grandchildren of the sons of any such Sovereign in the direct male line ... shall have and enjoy in all occasions the style and title enjoyed by the children of Dukes of these Our Realms" (i.e., Lord or Lady before their Christian name). In addition the letters stated save as aforesaid the style title or attribute of Royal Highness, Highness or Serene Highness and the titular dignity of Prince or Princess shall not henceforth be assumed or borne by any descendant of any Sovereign of these Realms.
Both the proclamation and the letters patent of 1917 remain in force today, excepting a few amendments and creations noted.
However, the former reigning Duke of Brunswick, head of the House of Hanover, refused to recognise the letters depriving his children of the British and Irish princely titles, and in 1931, he issued a decree, in the capacity of the head of the House of Hanover and senior male-line descendant of George III, stating that the members of the former Hanoverian royal family would continue to bear the title of Prince (or Princess) of Great Britain and Ireland with the style of Royal Highness. This title and style remains in use to this day by his descendants, including the current head of the House of Hanover, Prince Ernst August. The decree by the head of the House of Hanover is not legally recognised in the United Kingdom or Ireland, and the titles are used as titles of pretence. Since, however, the Hanovers are born in the male-line of George II, they were bound by the Royal Marriages Act 1772 until repealed in 2015. Thus, before his marriage to Princess Caroline of Monaco, Ernst August requested, and Queen Elizabeth II issued on 11 January 1999, an Order in Council: "My Lords, I do hereby declare My Consent to a Contract of Matrimony between His Royal Highness Prince Ernst August Albert of Hanover, Duke of Brunswick-Luneburg and Her Serene Highness Princess Caroline Louise Marguerite of Monaco..." Without the royal assent, the marriage would have been void in the United Kingdom.
After the abdication crisis of 1936, King George VI issued letters patent (dated 27 May 1937) regranting his elder brother his style as son of a sovereign, whilst expressly denying the style of Royal Highness to his wife and descendants. The marriage, however, had no issue.
On 22 October 1948, George VI issued letters patent allowing the children of his daughter Princess Elizabeth, Duchess of Edinburgh, and son-in-law Philip, Duke of Edinburgh, to assume princely titles and the style Royal Highness; they would not have been entitled to them ordinarily, as grandchildren in the female line, until their mother ascended the throne as Elizabeth II. Thus her son was styled HRH Prince Charles of Edinburgh until his mother's accession. Otherwise the children would have been styled Earl of Merioneth and Lady Anne Mountbatten, respectively.
Elizabeth II issued letters patent, dated 22 February 1957, creating Philip, Duke of Edinburgh, a Prince of the United Kingdom of Great Britain and Northern Ireland. Prince Philip had been born a Prince of Greece and Denmark, titles he renounced upon going through the naturalisation process, unaware that he was already a British subject by virtue of the Sophia Naturalization Act 1705.
On the wedding day of Prince Edward and Sophie Rhys-Jones, it was announced by Buckingham Palace that Elizabeth II, in agreement with their wishes, had declared that their children would be styled as children of an earl, and not as Princes of the United Kingdom with the style Royal Highness.
 On 31 December 2012, Elizabeth II declared that all the children of the eldest son of the Prince of Wales, at that time Prince William, Duke of Cambridge, would have the title Prince or Princess and the style Royal Highness. Accordingly, Prince William's eldest son, born on 22 July 2013, was styled His Royal Highness Prince George of Cambridge. His daughter, born on 2 May 2015, was styled Her Royal Highness Princess Charlotte of Cambridge. His second son, born on 23 April 2018, was styled His Royal Highness Prince Louis of Cambridge.

Styles of British princes

 Sovereign's heir apparent if Prince of Wales – HRH The Prince of Wales.
 Sovereign's sons (not Prince of Wales) with peerage – HRH The Prince X, Duke of Y (with Y being the territorial designation of their highest peerage), e.g., HRH The Prince Harry, Duke of Sussex.
 Sovereign's sons without peerage – HRH The Prince X, e.g., HRH The Prince John.
 Sovereign's male line grandsons with peerage – HRH Prince "X", Duke of "Y" (with Y being the territorial designation of their highest title), e.g., HRH Prince Edward, Duke of Kent.
 Sovereign's male line grandsons without peerage – HRH Prince "X" of "Y" (with Y being the territorial designation of their father's highest title), e.g., HRH Prince Michael of Kent.
 Sovereign's great-grandsons whose father is the oldest son of the heir apparent – HRH Prince "X" of "Y" (with Y being the territorial designation of their father's highest title), e.g., His Royal Highness Prince George of Cambridge.

List of British princes since 1714

The descendants of Ernest Augustus, Duke of Brunswick, head of the House of Hanover and the senior male-line descendant of King George III, who bear the title Prince or Princess of the United Kingdom with the style of Royal Highness as a secondary title of pretense.

Of the 58 British princes listed here, two are spouses of a reigning Queen, and eight lost their title after World War I.

 – In letters patent dated 20 November 1917, King George V restricted the title of Prince to the children of the sovereign, the children of the sovereign's sons, and the eldest living son of the eldest son of the Prince of Wales.

 – By an Order in Council dated 28 March 1919, as authorized by the Titles Deprivation Act 1917, King George V suspended the British peerage titles, princely dignities and honours of those who sided with Germany in World War I.

See also
List of current British princes and princesses
British royal family
List of British monarchs
British princess
List of peerages created for British princes
Prince of Waterloo, a title in the Dutch and Belgian nobility, held by the Duke of Wellington.

Notes and references

Notes

References